Lucie Gabrielle Randoin (11 May 1888 – 13 September 1960) was a French biologist, nutritionist, and hygienist. She was made a commander of the Legion of Honour in 1958 and is known for her research on vitamins.

Early life 
Lucie Randoin was born Lucie Fandard on May 11, 1888, in Bouers-en-Othe, Yonne. She attended the École Normale Supérieure in Paris and went on to attend the University of Clermont-Ferrand and the University of Paris, where she received her Ph.D. in 1918.

Career and research 
In the last year of her doctoral studies, Randoin joined Albert Dastre as his research assistant. After receiving her doctorate, she went on to become a researcher at the Oceanographic Institute of Paris, a position she held for two years, from 1918 to 1920. Randoin was the director of the physiology laboratory at the French Institut national de la recherche agronomique (National Institute of Agricultural Research) from 1924 to 1954; she had been a researcher there from 1920 to 1923. Randoin was also the director of the Institut Supérieur de l'Alimentation (Institute of Nutritional Science) from 1942 to 1960, and the director of the École Dietétique in 1951.

Randoin spent her research career studying the role of vitamins in metabolism and their composition. She discovered that vitamins B and C can affect sugar metabolism, which led to research on the connection between alcoholism and malnutrition.

Honors 
Randoin was awarded the Natural Sciences fellowship in 1911, one of the first women to receive it. She was admitted into the Académie de Medecin in 1946 and was a 1958 recipient of the Legion of Honor.

References 

French biologists
1960 deaths
French women biologists
1888 births
20th-century French women scientists
20th-century biologists